David Manley may refer to:

 David Manley (philosopher), American philosopher
 David Manley (artist), British artist, educationalist and arts administrator